Kerry Victor Joseph Fitzgerald (c. 1948 – 18 December 1991) was an Australian rugby union referee best known for officiating in the 1987 Rugby World Cup Final, the first ever Rugby World Cup final.

Refereeing career
Fitzgerald took up refereeing in 1977, making his international debut in 1984 in a match between New Zealand and Fiji in Suva.

For the first Rugby World Cup in 1987 he was one of two Australian referees selected. Fitzgerald sent off Welsh player Huw Richards after he had been knocked unconscious during a semifinal between New Zealand and Wales. He went on to referee the World Cup Final.

He went on to referee 26 tests, including the England-Scotland Rugby World Cup Semi-final in 1991, just 6 weeks before his death.

Death
Fitzgerald collapsed and died in his office on 18 December 1991.

References

1991 deaths
Australian rugby union referees
Year of birth uncertain
1948 births
Rugby World Cup referees
ARU referees